XHEMI-FM is a radio station on 105.7 FM in Cosoleacaque, Veracruz. It is owned by Radiorama and carries its Latino format.

History

XEMI-AM 1070 received its concession on June 21, 1961. It was owned by Eduardo Martínez Celís. For most of its history, it operated with 500 watts.

XEMI was cleared for AM-FM migration in 2010 as XHEMI-FM 105.7.

References

Radio stations in Veracruz
Radio stations established in 1961